Pioneer 6, 7, 8, and 9 were space probes in the Pioneer program, launched between 1965 and 1969. They were a series of solar-orbiting, spin-stabilized, solar cell- and battery-powered satellites designed to obtain measurements on a continuing basis of interplanetary phenomena from widely separated points in space. They were also known as Pioneer A, B, C, and D. The fifth (Pioneer E) was lost in a launch accident, and therefore did not receive a numerical designation.

Purpose 
Pioneers 6, 7, 8, and 9 were created to make the first detailed, comprehensive measurements of the solar wind, solar magnetic field and cosmic rays. They were designed to measure large scale magnetic phenomena and particles and fields in interplanetary space. Data from the vehicles have been used to better understand stellar processes and the structure and flow of the solar wind. The vehicles also acted as the world's first space-based solar weather network, providing practical data on solar storms which affect communications and power on Earth. 

The experiments studied the positive ions (cations) and electrons in the solar wind, the interplanetary electron density (radio propagation experiment), solar and galactic cosmic rays, and the Interplanetary Magnetic Field.

The spacecraft were important collectors of heliophysics and space weather data. In conjunction with other spacecraft these, for the first time, enabled spaceborne observations to be combined with terrestrial observations on the ground and from sounding balloons. Pioneer 9 in early August 1972 recorded significant observations of one of the most potent solar storms ever recorded, and the most hazardous to human spaceflight during the Space Age.

Vehicle description
Each craft was identical.

The main antenna was a high-gain directional antenna. The spacecraft were spin-stabilized at about 60 RPM, and the spin axis was perpendicular to the ecliptic plane and pointed toward the south ecliptic pole.

Instruments:

 Solar Wind Plasma Faraday Cup (6, 7)
 Cosmic-Ray Telescope (6, 7)
 Electrostatic Analyzer (6, 7, 8)
 Superior Conjunction Faraday Rotation (6, 7)
 Spectral Broadening (6)
 Relativity Investigation (6)
 Uniaxial Fluxgate Magnetometer (6)
 Cosmic-Ray Anisotropy (6, 7, 8, 9)
 Celestial Mechanics (6, 7, 8, 9)
 Two-Frequency Beacon Receiver (6, 7, 8, 9)
 Single-Axis Magnetometer (7, 8)
 Cosmic Dust Detector (8, 9)
 Cosmic Ray Gradient Detector (8, 9)
 Plasma Wave Detector (8)
 Triaxial Magnetometer (9)
 Solar Plasma Detector (9)
 Electric Field Detector (9)

Communications 
By ground command, one of five bit rates, one of four data formats, and one of four operating modes could be selected. The five-bit rates were 512, 256, 64, 16, and 8 bit/s. Three of the four data formats contained primarily scientific data and consisted of 32 seven-bit words per frame. One scientific data format was for use at the two highest bit rates. Another was for use at the three lowest bit rates. The third contained data from only the radio propagation experiment. The fourth data format contained mainly engineering data.

The four operating modes were: real-time, telemetry store, duty cycle store, and memory readout. In the real-time mode, data were sampled and transmitted directly (without storage) as specified by the data format and bit rate selected. In the telemetry store mode, data were stored and transmitted simultaneously in the format and at the bit rate selected. In the duty-cycle store mode, a single frame of scientific data was collected and stored at a rate of 512 bit/s. The time interval between the collection and storage of successive frames could be varied by ground command between 2 and 17 min to provide partial data coverage for periods up to 19 hours, as limited by the bit storage capacity. In the memory readout mode, data was read out at whatever bit rate was appropriate to the satellite distance from Earth.

Time line and current status
As stated by JPL, "The Pioneer 6–9 program has been touted as one of the least expensive of all NASA spacecraft programs in terms of scientific results per dollar spent." Although the four spacecraft have not been regularly tracked for science data return in recent years, a successful telemetry contact with Pioneer 6 was made on December 8, 2000 to celebrate 35 years of continuous operation since launch. Its original design life expectancy was only 6 months.

Although NASA described Pioneer 6 as "extant" , there has been no contact since December 8, 2000. At this time Pioneer 6 had operated for 12,758 days, making it the oldest operating space probe until it was surpassed by Voyager 2 on August 13, 2012. It is also believed that contact is still possible with Pioneer 7 and 8; only Pioneer 9 is definitely not working.

Pioneer 6
December 16, 1965
Launched at 07:31:00 UTC from Cape Canaveral to a circular solar orbit with a mean distance of 0.8 AU.

December 1995
The prime Traveling-wave tube (TWT) failed sometime after December 1995.

July 1996
Spacecraft commanded to the backup TWT.

October 6, 1997
Tracked with the 70 meter Deep Space Station 43 in Australia.
The MIT and ARC Plasma Analyzers, as well as the cosmic ray detector from the University of Chicago, were turned on and working.

December 8, 2000
Successful telemetry contact for about two hours.

Pioneer 7
August 17, 1966
Launched from Cape Canaveral into solar orbit with a mean distance of 1.1 AU.

March 20, 1986  
Flew within 12.3 million kilometers of Halley's Comet and monitored the interaction between the cometary hydrogen tail and the solar wind. It discovered He+ plasma produced by charge exchange of solar wind He++ with neutral cometary material.

March 31, 1995
Tracked successfully. The spacecraft and one of the science instruments were still functioning.

Pioneer 8
December 13, 1967
Launched at 14:08:00 UTC from Cape Canaveral into solar orbit with a mean distance of 1.1 AU from the Sun.

August 22, 1996
The spacecraft commanded to switch to the backup TWT. Downlink signal was re-acquired, one of the science instruments again functioning.

Pioneer 9
November 8, 1968
Launched at 09:46:00 UTC from Cape Canaveral into solar orbit with a mean distance of 0.8 AU.

1983 Final contact.

1987 Contact was attempted, but failed.

Pioneer E
August 27, 1969
Launched at 21:59:00 UTC from Cape Canaveral. The launch vehicle was destroyed by range safety after hydraulics in the first stage failed.

See also 
17776, a speculative fiction work featuring a sentient Pioneer 9

References

External links

 Pioneer Project Page
 Pioneer 6 Profile by NASA's Solar System Exploration
 Pioneer 7 Profile by NASA's Solar System Exploration
 Pioneer 8 Profile by NASA's Solar System Exploration
 Pioneer 9 Profile by NASA's Solar System Exploration
 Pioneer E Profile by NASA's Solar System Exploration
 NSSDC Master Catalog: Spacecraft Pioneer 6
 NSSDC Master Catalog: Spacecraft Pioneer 7
 NSSDC Master Catalog: Spacecraft Pioneer 8
 NSSDC Master Catalog: Spacecraft Pioneer 9
 NSSDC Master Catalog: Spacecraft Pioneer-E

Pioneer 06
Missions to the Sun
Derelict space probes
Derelict satellites in heliocentric orbit